Italy–Japan relations refers to the bilateral relations between the Italian Republic and Japan.

Bilateral relations between Japan and Italy formally began on 25 August 1866, but the first contacts between the two countries date back at least to the 16th century, when the first Japanese mission to Europe arrived in Rome in 1585 led by Itō Mancio.

In the 19th century Italy and Japan saw great changes in their political and social structure, with the former gaining national unity in 1861 and the latter entering, from 1868, into a process of profound modernization along Western lines that took the name of the Meiji Restoration. In this same period relations became increasingly close, culminating in the participation of the two countries as allies in both World Wars.

After the Second World War, Italy and Japan both experienced a period of strong economic growth, which enabled them to recover from the disastrous situation in which they found themselves after the end of the conflict and to forge renewed economic and trade agreements, as well as active scientific cooperation for technological development.

Nowadays, Italy and Japan enjoy a cordial and friendly relationship. Italy is one of the best loved countries in Japan and one of the most popular European tourist destinations, thanks above all to the success of the Made in Italy brand which has contributed, since the 1990s, to increasing Japanese appreciation of Italian culture.

Italy has an embassy in Tokyo and Japan has an embassy in Rome.

Early relations from the 13th Century 
Although relations between Japan and Italy formally began with the signing of the first treaty of friendship in 1866, the first contacts between the two nations can be traced back to the 13th century, when Marco Polo (1254-1324) learned of the existence of Japan, which he called Cipango (or Zipangu). Although he never set foot on Japanese soil, the Venetian navigator described the Japanese country as a large independent island full of riches. He is credited as being the first person to introduce the "island country" into the European imagination.

Japan remained relatively isolated and therefore immune to Western influence at least until 1543, when a Portuguese ship containing Portuguese and Italian Jesuits was blown off course and landed in the Asian country. The Japanese Roman Catholic Christian daimyōs dispatched the Tenshō embassy to Pope Gregory XIII. This was the first Japanese mission in a foreign land on the initiative of the missionary Alessandro Valignano and the Christian daimyō Ōtomo Sōrin, Ōmura Sumitada and Arima Harunobu. The delegation consisted of four young dignitaries: Itō Mancio, Giuliano Nakaura, Martino Hara and Michele Chijiwa, joined by the Jesuit Diogo de Mesquita, who acted as their interpreter.

The group arrived in Italy in 1585 and were received in Rome by Pope Gregory XIII and especially by his successor Pope Sixtus V, who made them a gift of the Church of Santa Maria dell'Orto, which has been the place of worship for the Japanese Catholic community in the Italian capital ever since. In 1615, the daimyō of Sendai, Date Masamune, sent another delegation headed by the samurai Hasekura Tsunenaga. The latter met Pope Paul V, and formally requested a trade treaty between Japan and Mexico (then Viceroyalty of New Spain), as well as the sending of Christian missionaries to Japan.

The 19th Century 
During the 19th century Italy and Japan experienced similar historical periods, characterised by huge changes in their political and social structure. Italy achieved national unity in 1861 during the period known as the Risorgimento, while Japan saw the end of the Bakufu system and the beginning in 1868 of a process of profound modernization along Western lines that came to be known as the Meiji Restoration.

This period also coincided with the beginning of formal relations between the two countries: in 1860 the first Italian merchant ship docked in Nagasaki, while the arrival of the military steamer Magenta in the port of Yokohama (27 May 1866) led to the signing of the Treaty of Friendship and Commerce on 25 August of the same year, ratified in Edo by Captain Vittorio Arminjon.

As a result, the Italian ships were able to expand their activities to the ports of Kanagawa, Nagasaki and Hakodate. One year later, Tokugawa Akitake, younger brother of the shogun Tokugawa Yoshinobu, went to Italy as part of the first official Japanese trip to the European country, which also corresponded to the last official trip organized by the Tokugawa shogunate, close to its collapse.

The beginning of official relations was also characterized by an intense commercial exchange, which led Italy, between the end of the Edo period (1603-1868) and the beginning of the Meiji period (1868-1912), to absorb up to one fifth of Japanese silkworm eggs exports.

In 1873, the Iwakura mission arrived in Italy, organized by the new government as part of the series of measures it had taken to renew Japan. A key figure in the relations between the two countries was Count Alessandro Fè d'Ostiani, designated Minister Plenipotentiary for China and Japan in 1870, who accompanied the members of the mission during their visit. The mission visited cities such as Florence, Naples, Venice and Rome, where it was received by Victor Emmanuel II. The main interest in Italy was directed towards artisanal works and the different aspects of modernization in the country.

In the meantime, some Italians obtained important public positions in the Japanese government, testifying to the growing influence of Italy in Japan. In 1872, Edoardo Chiossone became director of the Ministry of Finance's Paper and Securities Workshop, Alessandro Paternostro was legal advisor to the Ministry of Justice from 1885 to 1890, General Pompeo Grillo worked at the Osaka foundry from 1884 to 1888, followed by Major Quaratesi from 1889 to 1890 and Major Scipione Braccialini, who taught ballistics from 1892 to 1893.

Japanese art and culture was also influenced by Italy, not least because the painter Antonio Fontanesi, the sculptor Vincenzo Ragusa and the architect Giovanni Vincenzo Cappelletti came to Japan in 1876. They were invited by the government of Tokyo, as part of the modernization process strongly desired by Emperor Mutsuhito. Fontanesi became rector and head of the art department of the Tokyo Technical School of Fine Arts, Ragusa played a significant role in the development of modern Japanese sculpture by introducing bronze casting technologies and other European sculpture techniques, while Cappelletti designed the Yūshūkan military museum at the Yasukuni shrine.

The popularity of opera in Italy led to the development of a new musical genre called "Japanese opera", which in turn influenced Italian opera, as in the case of Giacomo Puccini's Madama Butterfly.

In 1894, a further agreement between the two countries was signed, strengthening the one of 1866, while in 1912 a treaty on trade and navigation was signed. Italy and Japan were also part of the Eight-Nation Alliance that put down the Boxer Rebellion in China between 1899 and 1901.

The World Wars

First World War 
During World War I, they were both members of the Allied Powers and fought against Germany from 1914 to 1918. After the war, the Kingdom of Italy turned out to be one of the nations in favor of the clause on  Japanese racial equality proposal put forward by the Japanese Empire during the Paris Peace Conference in 1919.

Military relations between the two countries also continued during the intervention in Siberia (1918-1922) during which they fought against Communists as allies. This operation that took place within the general framework of a larger plan of intervention by the Western powers and Japan against the Red Army during the Russian Civil War.

In the meantime, in 1920, pilots Guido Masiero and Arturo Ferrarin, together with their engine drivers Roberto Maretto and Gino Capannini, successfully completed the 'Rome-Tokyo Raid', which writers Gabriele D'Annunzio and Harukichi Shimoi had called for, and which represented the first air link between Europe and Japan.

Second World War 
In 1940, Italy and Japan were both members of the Axis Powers after signing the Tripartite Pact (World War II). The situation after the end of the First World War and the dissatisfaction with the Treaty of Versailles of 1919 led Italy to join the Anti-Comintern Pact in 1937 (an agreement made a year earlier between Japan and Nazi Germany to counter the work of the Communist International), which gave rise to the tripartite alliance that would be formalized on 27 September 1940 in Berlin.

In the period between these two agreements, Japan and Italy established important political and diplomatic contacts that resulted in various trade and economic agreements, sealed by the Italian economic mission to Nagasaki in 1938. Relations between the two countries were facilitated by Japan's recognition of Italy's sovereignty over East Africa, which allowed the opening of important trade routes between the latter and the new Italian colonies. In 1923, Keizō Shibusawa, who in the following years would become first governor of the Bank of Japan and then Minister of Finance, visited Italy on one of his business trips, staying in Rome, Florence and Milan.

Subsequently, other states also joined the coalition by adhering to the Tripartite Pact (mainly nations dissatisfied with the geopolitical order created after the First World War), forming the so-called Axis powers, which took part in the Second World War in opposition to the Allied countries. However, with the signing of the Cassibile armistice in 1943, relations between Japan and Italy came to an abrupt halt: the Italians who were engaged in military operations in Japan at the time were interned and imprisoned in various prison camps scattered throughout the country. The same fate befell scholars and intellectuals of the time, such as the Florentine orientalist Fosco Maraini. The Japanese Empire maintained political and economic relations with the Italian Social Republic for the whole duration of the latter (1943-1945), although relations between the two states were never idyllic due to basic differences in war aims during the final years of the conflict. After the conclusion of the war, 158 Italian nationals were deported from Japan.

Relations from 1945 to the present day 

During the Cold War, Japan and Italy, both nations were defeated in the Second World War. Japan and Italy resumed cooperation and became part of the so-called Western bloc (led by the United States of America), which for about half a century was politically and ideologically opposed to the Eastern bloc (Soviet Union, Warsaw Pact allies and friendly countries).

At the same time, both countries experienced a period of strong economic growth, which enabled them to recover from the disastrous situation of the years immediately following the end of the war. Italy, thanks to its role as a link between Western Europe, the Balkan Peninsula, Central Europe and North Africa, benefited from substantial aid from the Marshall Plan from 1947 onwards. This, combined with low labour costs, led to a great expansion of the country's economy in the 1950s and 1960s. Similarly, Japan, thanks to the assistance of the United States of America and the concomitance of some favourable factors (such as the affordable price of oil, the intervention of the Japanese government to support Japanese enterprises and the determination of the people to get out of the deficit situation quickly), was able to recover quickly and become the third economic power in the world already in the 1960s. Thus, from predominantly rural countries, Italy and Japan found themselves becoming major industrial powers, and although the sectors in which they succeeded differed considerably from one another (think of Made in Italy in Italy and electronic products in Japan), both managed to establish themselves in a similar way in the automotive sector. It was precisely the success of the Made in Italy brand in the 1990s that led to a considerable increase in Japanese appreciation of Italian culture and tradition. However, after about thirty years of growth, both countries experienced a long phase of economic recession, aggravated by the common phenomenon of an ageing population, which in turn led to an explosion of public debt and a loss of productivity and competitiveness in the production systems of the two nations.

In 2002, the then President of the Italian Republic Carlo Azeglio Ciampi described relations between the two countries as being based on "an ancient and firm friendship, nourished by a continuous tradition of exchange and cooperation". In 2009, the Japanese government donated more than €6 million to Italy for the project of assistance and reconstruction of the city of L'Aquila, hit by an earthquake in April of that year. Similarly, Italy was at the forefront of providing humanitarian aid to Japan following the Tōhoku earthquake and tidal wave in 2011, as well as engaging in solidarity initiatives in the following years, mainly from the private sector. In 2014, Italian Prime Minister Matteo Renzi described relations with Japan as "absolutely important and crucial".

Today, Italy is one of the most loved countries by Japanese women and young people and one of the most popular European tourist destinations, while the Italian language is one of the most studied languages. In Italy, events dedicated to Japanese culture are very successful, especially those focused on mass culture (anime, manga, cinematography) and those dedicated to Japanese gastronomy, art and tradition.

See also
 Foreign relations of Italy
 Foreign relations of Japan

Country comparison

References

Baskett, Michael (2009). "All Beautiful Fascists?: Axis Film Culture in Imperial Japan" in The Culture of Japanese Fascism, ed. Alan Tansman. Durham: Duke University Press. pp. 212–234.

External links
 Presenza Italiana in Giappone 2010" (Archive). Italian Trade Commission.

 
Japan
Bilateral relations of Japan